USS Mingoe was a large double-ended, side wheel, ironclad steamer gunboat commissioned by the Union Navy during the American Civil War. They also stationed it as an interceptor gunboat off Confederate waterways to prevent trading with foreign countries.

Service history
An ironclad, side wheel, steam gunboat, with schooner rigging, Mingoe was built under contract with Daniel S. Mershon, Jr. at Bordentown, New Jersey, at a shipyard located along the Delaware River. The ship was named after the Mingo people, an Iroquoian-speaking group that had been based in western Ohio in the early nineteenth century. She was reported "laid down" and under construction in Bordentown by the Navy Department on October 15, 1862. By January 31, 1863 the keel had been laid. The ship's armor consisted of iron cladding the sides above the water sufficiently to protect the men on deck. By May 29, 1863 the ship was so far along in construction, the New York Times predicted that she would be launched on June 10. She was launched 6 August 1863, and commissioned 29 July 1864 at Philadelphia, Pennsylvania, Comdr. J. B. Creighton in command.

USS Mingoe joined the South Atlantic Blockading Squadron on 13 August 1864 and performed blockade duty in the St. Johns River and off Charleston, South Carolina, until the end of the year. In February 1865, the Navy used her to assist General William Tecumseh Sherman’s Army in its advance up the James River. After the end of the conflict, Mingoe returned to Philadelphia, Pennsylvania. The ship was laid up at League Island until sold 3 October 1867.

References 

Ships of the Union Navy
Ships built in New Jersey
Sassacus-class gunboats
Steamships of the United States Navy
1863 ships